Barry Murphy may refer to:

Hurlers
 Barry Murphy (Cork hurler) (1888–?), Irish hurler
 Barry Murphy (Clare hurler) (born 1975), Irish hurler
 Barry Murphy (Limerick hurler) (born 1997), Irish hurler

Other sports
 Barry Murphy (footballer, born 1940), English footballer for Barnsley
 Barry Murphy (footballer, born 1959), Irish footballer
 Barry Murphy (footballer, born 1985) (born 1990), Irish footballer for Shamrock
 Barry Murphy (rugby union) (born 1982), Ireland and Munster rugby player
 Barry Murphy (swimmer) (born 1985), Irish swimmer

Other people
 Barry Murphy (comedian), Irish comedian
 Barry Murphy (politician) (born 1939), former Australian politician

See also
 John Barry-Murphy (1892–?), Irish hurler for Cork
 Dinny Barry-Murphy (1903–1973), Irish hurler for Cork
 Jimmy Barry-Murphy (born 1954), Irish footballer, hurler, coach
 Brian Barry-Murphy (born 1978), Irish footballer